Brittany Bonnici (born 3 August 1997) is an Australian rules footballer playing for the Collingwood Football Club in the AFL Women's (AFLW).

Early life and state football
Bonnici first played competitively with the under-11 boys of the Wallan Football Club. Following a bad run of concussions in 2015, she only played two senior games for St Kilda Sharks in 2016. As a result of the concussions, she also started wearing a helmet during her games.

AFL Women's career
Bonnici made her debut in round 1, 2017, in the inaugural AFLW match at IKON Park against . After round 6, she was nominated for the season's Rising Star award.

Collingwood re-signed Bonnici for the 2018 season during the trade period in May 2017.

Collingwood re-signed Bonnici for the 2019 season during the trade period in June 2018.

Bonnici had a successful season for Collingwood in 2021, awarded with her maiden All-Australian blazer, named on the interchange bench. She led the league for marks and disposals. Because of this, she was selected in Champion Data's 2021 AFLW All-Star stats team.

Statistics
Statistics are correct to the end of the S7 (2022) season

|- 
! scope="row" style="text-align:center" | 2017
|style="text-align:center;"|
| 8 || 7 || 0 || 0 || 46 || 18 || 64 || 8 || 32 || 0.0 || 0.0 || 6.6 || 2.6 || 9.1 || 1.1 || 4.6 || 0
|- 
! scope="row" style="text-align:center" | 2018
|style="text-align:center;"|
| 8 || 7 || 1 || 0 || 45 || 33 || 78 || 14 || 24 || 0.1 || 0.0 || 6.4 || 4.7 || 11.1 || 2.0 || 3.4 || 0
|- 
! scope="row" style="text-align:center" | 2019
|style="text-align:center;"|
| 8 || 7 || 0 || 2 || 71 || 17 || 88 || 16 || 44 || 0.0 || 0.3 || 10.1 || 2.4 || 12.6 || 2.3 || 6.3 || 1
|- 
! scope="row" style="text-align:center" | 2020
|style="text-align:center;"|
| 8 || 7 || 0 || 1 || 95 || 42 || 137 || 25 || 30 || 0.0 || 0.1 || 13.6 || 6.0 || 19.6 || 3.6 || 4.3 || 7
|- 
! scope="row" style="text-align:center" | 2021
|style="text-align:center;"|
| 8 || 11 || 0 || 2 || 173 || 83 || bgcolor=CAE1FF | 256† || bgcolor=FA8072 | 60§ || 38 || 0.0 || 0.2 || 15.7 || 7.5 || bgcolor=CAE1FF | 23.3† || bgcolor=FA8072 | 5.5§ || 3.5 || 12
|- 
! scope="row" style="text-align:center" | 2022
|style="text-align:center;"|
| 8 || 8 || 2 || 2 || 111 || 41 || 152 || 26 || 44 || 0.3 || 0.3 || 13.9 || 5.1 || 19.0 || 3.3 || 5.5 || 12
|- 
! scope="row" style="text-align:center" | S7 (2022)
|
| 8 || 0 || — || — || — || — || — || — || — || — || — || — || — || — || — || — || —
|- class="sortbottom"
! colspan=3| Career
! 47
! 3
! 7
! 541
! 234
! 775
! 149
! 212
! 0.1
! 0.1
! 11.5
! 5.0
! 16.5
! 3.2
! 4.5
! 32
|}

References

External links

 

Living people
1997 births
Collingwood Football Club (AFLW) players
Australian rules footballers from Melbourne
Sportswomen from Victoria (Australia)